This is a list of the 35 members of the European Parliament for Romania in the 2004 to 2009 session, replacing the members who were appointed by the Romanian Parliament.

List

Notes

2007
 
Romania